Jane was launched in Aberdeen in 1797. She spent her entire career as a whaler in the British northern whale fishery. She was lost in 1829 in the Davis Strait.

Career
Most of Janes early career is obscure. In 1802 the Aberdeen Whaling Company purchased her. In 1810 she did come back into Aberdeen with one of the largest cargoes brought into that port: 17 whales yielding 200 tons of oil.

The following data is from Coltish:

A list of vessels registered in Scottish ports in 1821 reported that Janes owner was the Union Whale Fishing Company, (aka Dundee Union Whale Fishing Co.).

Lloyd's List (LL) reported on 31 July 1821 that Jane, Bruce, master, had been lost.

Fate
In 1829 Jane was lost in the Davis Strait. There were no casualties amongst her crew.

Notes, citations, and references
Notes

Citations

References

 
 
  

1797 ships
Ships built in Aberdeen
Age of Sail merchant ships of England
Whaling ships
Maritime incidents in 1829